, also known as Mr. President, is one of Japan's largest adult video (AV) producers, featuring an extensive catalog of video titles.

Company information
The Moodyz website, www.moodyz.com, went online in March 2000 and the company released its first videos in September 2000 starting with Costume Princess starring Maiko Yuki. One of the studios earliest stars was AV Idol Bunko Kanazawa who appeared in her own installment of the Costume Princess series in December 2000. In October 2002, the company's fortunes were boosted by signing An Nanba to an exclusive contract for Moodyz beginning with her debut video Number.1!

To mark their fifth anniversary in September 2005, the studio released the fantasy costume drama, A Queendom of Eros, directed by KINGDOM and starring Chihiro Hara, Azusa Ayano, Jun Seto, Miki Komori, Shuri Himesaki and Yuna Takizawa. The work's elaborate sets and props made it one of the most expensive adult videos produced.

Moodyz is part of the large AV conglomerate Hokuto Corporation, which distributes Moodyz produced videos through retail sales and via mail order and digital download from its portal DMM.com. The Moodyz company manager and representative is Hitomi Niwa (丹羽ひとみ).

The company produces about 30-35 new releases and compilation videos per month and in September 2011 the DMM website listed more than 4000 DVD titles and over 1200 VHS tapes available under the Moodyz name.

Moodyz labels
Moodyz produces various genres of videos under different labels. These range from softer glamour works to more hardcore scenes featuring bukkake, gokkun, anal sex, simulated rape, and interracial videos with black actors. Listed below are the labels used by Moodyz over the years.

 ACID
 ALL
  - amateur nanpa themes
 ASS
 BEST - compilations
 BOMB
 Collection
 DIVA
 EDGE
 ES - FemDom fetish
 Fresh - new actresses
 Gati - features bukkake, gokkun, anal sex
  - mature women
 GREAT
 Honey
 IMAGE
 Imperial
 ISM
 Joker
 Killer
 Legend - popular AV Idols
 
 MODERATO - featured actresses
 NEW - actress debuts
 OH - bukkake, interracial
 President
 QUEST
 REAL - popular actresses
 REPLAY - compilations at low prices
 TOKKAR
 VALUE - bargain videos
 WILD - hardcore, anal, urination & rape scenes

Directors
Directors who have worked extensively for Moodyz include:

 [Jo]Style
 Hideto Aki
 FLAGMAN
 Katsuyuki Hasegawa
 Hiroa
 KINGDOM
 Alala Kurosawa
 Kazuhiko Matsumoto
 Kenzo Nagira
 Fubuki Sakura
 Taikei Shimizu
 Goro Tameike
 Tadanori Usami
 Bunchou Yoshino

Actresses
Since its inception a number of prominent AV Idols have performed in Moodyz videos, including the following actresses:

 Yua Aida
 Hotaru Akane
 Rin Aoki
 Minami Aoyama
 Yui Haruka
 Hikari Hino
 Rinako Hirasawa
 Bunko Kanazawa
 Mariko Kawana
 Hikari Kisugi
 Kirari Koizumi
 Mayu Koizumi
 Marina Kyono
 Nei Nanami
 Saya Misaki
 Momoka
 Ran Monbu
 Kyoko Nakajima
 An Nanba
 JULIA
 Momoka Nishina
 Nao Oikawa
 Maria Ozawa
 Nao Saejima
 Sayuki
 Izumi Seika
 Manami Suzuki
 Hitomi Tanaka
 Maki Tomoda
 Aki Tomosaki
 Tsubomi
 Akira Watase
 Sally Yoshino
 Makoto Yuki
 Anri Okita
 Shiori Kamisaki

Bonenkai and Moodyz Awards
Beginning in December 2001, Moodyz has held an annual year-end bonenkai (忘年会) party for its actresses and staff. This gala event with participants in full evening dress started out modestly with 217 participants at the "Nepushisu" Restaurant in Tokyo on December 27, 2001. The 2002 party had 400 guests and by 2003 the number had risen to 700 and then to over 1000 for the 2005 event. Guests included actresses and staff, managers, friends, and the press. The party was also the venue for the annual Moodyz Awards celebrating the work of Moodyz actresses and directors.

Video series

Dream School series

The Dream School (ドリーム学園) or Dream Gakuen series is one of Moodyz oldest, best selling and most honored set of videos. The first volume was released in July 2001 when Moodyz had been in existence only a little over a year. Dream School 2 and Dream School 5 were the 2001 and 2002 winners of the Grand Prize Moodyz Award at the annual Moodyz Awards while Dream School 7 won the 2003 award for most sales. In 2006 Dream School 10 was the Moodyz entry in the AV Open contest where it took the 2nd Place Award. Again in 2007, Moodyz nominated another entry in the series, Dream School 11, for the AV Open where it won the 3rd Place Award. The series has continued with Dream School 12, released in June 2008.

The Dream School videos, all directed by Taikei Shimizu, have usually been major productions running 3 or 4 hours and having a large cast of actors and actresses. They are plotted as dramas taking place in a high-school setting and include a medley of porn genres including bukkake, gokkun, S&M, simulated rape, urolagnia, anal sex, orgies and even occasionally scat and bestiality. Several AV stars have appeared in the series including Bunko Kanazawa, Izumi Seika, Nao Oikawa, Chihiro Hasegawa, Mayura Hoshitsuki, Kokoro Amano, Akira Watase, Hotaru Akane and Chihiro Hara.

Other series
This is a selected listing of the more than 200 thematic video series which have been produced under various Moodyz labels.

 Amateur Doll (素人生ドル)
 Black Men and Sex (黒人とセックス) - interracial
 Black Semen in L.A.  (ブラックザーメン in L.A.) - interracial
 Bukkake Nakadashi Anal Fuck (ぶっかけ中出しアナルFuck)
 Digital Mosaic (デジタルモザイク) - mosaic censoring applied by computer instead of analog methods
 Costume Play 7 (コスプレ7) - cosplay
 Disposable Masochist Slave (使い捨てM奴隷)
 Dream Idol (ドリームアイドル)
 Dream Woman (ドリームウーマン) - bukkake
 For the Best Onaniae (最高のオナニーのために)
 Genuine Nakadashi (真性中出し)
 Gokkun Club (ごっくんくらぶ)  or "Gokkun kurabu" - gokkun
 Gokkun Land (ゴックンランド) - gokkun
 Hyper-Digital Mosaic (ハイパーデジタルモザイク)
 Lewd Women Swallowing Sperm (痴女と精子) or "Chijo onna to seishi"
 Paipan Hyper Digital Mosaic (パイパンハイパーデジタルモザイク)
 Polygamy Dream
 Sell Debut (初セル)
 Sex on the Beach
 Sperm Viking (男汁バイキング)
 Torture Club (拷問くらぶ)
 Women Who Want to See the Penis (チンポを見たがる女たち)

References

Sources

External links
MOODYZ - official site
MOODYZ - archive 

Japanese pornographic film studios
Japanese companies established in 2000
Film production companies of Japan
Bukkake
Mass media companies established in 2000